The European Games is a quadrennial event which began in 2015. The Games records in athletics are the best marks set in competitions at the Games.

Men's records

Women's records

References

Athletics at the European Games
European Games
European Games
Athletics